Liberation of Peter is a 1665–1667 oil on canvas painting by Bartolomé Esteban Murillo, depicting a scene of the liberation of Peter from Acts 12 : 5–17. It is now in the Hermitage Museum in St Petersburg.

It was one of eight works painted by the artist for the Hermandad de la Caridad (Brothers of Charity) in Seville. Only four of these eight are still in Spain, namely The Miracle of the Loaves and Fishes, Moses at the Rock of Horeb, Saint Elizabeth of Hungary and Saint John of God. The Hermitage work and the remaining three (Abraham Welcoming Three Angels - National Gallery of Canada; Christ Healing the Paralytic at the Pool of Bethesda, National Gallery, London; The Return of the Prodigal Son - National Gallery of Art, Washington) were all looted by Marshal Soult in 1812

References

Paintings by Bartolomé Esteban Murillo
Paintings in the collection of the Hermitage Museum
1667 paintings
Paintings depicting Saint Peter
Angels in art